Gliese 521 is a double star in the northern constellation of Canes Venatici. The system is located at a distance of 43.6 light-years from the Sun based on parallax measurements, but is drawing closer with a radial velocity of −65.6 km/s. This star is too faint to be visible to the naked eye, having an apparent visual magnitude of +10.26 and an absolute magnitude of 10.24.

The primary is an M-type main-sequence star with a stellar classification of M1V. It is only about half the size and mass of the Sun. The star is rotating slowly with a projected rotational velocity of 0.85 km/s and a rotation period of roughly 49.5 days. The star has a lower metal-content compared to the Sun. It is radiating just 3% of the luminosity of the Sun from its photosphere at an effective temperature of 3,493 K.

A faint stellar companion was announced by E. Jódar and associates in 2013. The companion has an angular separation of  along a position angle of 352.1°° from the primary.

Search for planets 

According to Marcy & Benitz (1989) detected a possible periodicity of 510 days, inferring the possible presence of a massive planetary object with minimum mass of 12 times that of Jupiter in highly eccentric orbit (e=0.6). So far the planet has not been confirmed. A radial velocity study of the star during the period 2013–2017 initially found a promising signal, but this disappeared when additional data was collected and was instead attributed to magnetic activity.

See also 

 Gliese 806

References

M-type main-sequence stars
Hypothetical planetary systems
Double stars
Canes Venatici
Durchmusterung objects
0521
066625